Dustin James Wathan (born August 22, 1973) is an American former professional catcher who played for the Kansas City Royals of Major League Baseball (MLB) in , and who is currently the third base coach for the Philadelphia Phillies. He is a former manager of the Lehigh Valley IronPigs, the Triple-A affiliate of the Phillies in the International League.

Early life
Wathan was born in Jacksonville, Florida.  He attended Blue Springs High School in Blue Springs, Missouri, and Cerritos College in Norwalk, California. In 1994, he played collegiate summer baseball with the Brewster Whitecaps of the Cape Cod Baseball League.

Baseball career

Playing career

Wathan began his minor league playing career in 1994 with the AZL Mariners.  In , Wathan was a member of the Philadelphia Phillies organization and played for the Reading Phillies and Ottawa Lynx. He was the final out recorded in Lynx history, after grounding out to end the 2007 Lynx season which would go down as their final campaign. Wathan retired at the end of the 2007 season.

Wathan played 13 seasons in the minor leagues.  In 3,216 at bats, he hit .273/.360/.382 with 58 home runs, 24 stolen bases, and 417 RBIs. He played 831 games at catcher, 123 games at first base, five games at third base, and pitched in three games.

In 2002, he played in three games in the major leagues at catcher for the Kansas City Royals, batting 3-for-5.

Managerial and coaching career
In 2008, Wathan began his managerial career in the Phillies organization with the Williamsport Crosscutters of the Class A (Short Season) New York–Penn League. He managed the Lakewood BlueClaws (Class A South Atlantic League) in 2009 to win the league championship. From 2010 to 2011, he led the Class A-Advanced Clearwater Threshers of the Class A-Advanced Florida State League. He managed the Double-A Reading Fightin Phils of the Eastern League from 2012 to 2016. On July 22, 2016, he became the winningest manager in team history. Before the 2017 season, he was promoted to manage the Lehigh Valley IronPigs in the Class AAA International League.

On November 10, 2017, Wathan was named the third base coach on new Phillies skipper Gabe Kapler's staff.

Personal life
His father is former Major League Baseball player and manager John Wathan. His brother, Derek, played in minor league baseball from 1998 to 2008.

See also
List of second-generation Major League Baseball players

References

External links

1973 births
Living people
Akron Aeros players
American expatriate baseball players in Canada
Arizona League Mariners players
Baseball coaches from Florida
Baseball players from Jacksonville, Florida
Brewster Whitecaps players
Buffalo Bisons (minor league) players
Everett AquaSox players
Huntsville Stars players
Kansas City Royals players
Lancaster JetHawks players
Lehigh Valley IronPigs managers
Major League Baseball catchers
Major League Baseball third base coaches
Memphis Chicks players
New Haven Ravens players
Omaha Royals players
Orlando Rays players
Ottawa Lynx players
Philadelphia Phillies coaches
Portland Sea Dogs players
Reading Phillies managers
Reading Phillies players
Scranton/Wilkes-Barre Red Barons players
Tacoma Rainiers players
Wisconsin Timber Rattlers players